This is a list of fictional post office employees with a significant role in notable  works of fiction.

 Il Postino -  Italian postman in the movie of the same name
 Carl Schliff - a letter carrier in Dead Rising 2 who was more concerned with completing his route then getting bit by a zombie
 Choo-Choo Curtis (sometimes "Chug-Chug Curtis") - Pogo comic
 Gordon Krantz -  the eponymous protagonist of The Postman
 Gordon Smith - See Spot Run
 International Express Man -  Good Omens; played by Simon Merrells in the show
 Jack Danger (pronounced Donger) - an obnoxious postal inspection worker in season 2 of Brooklyn Nine-Nine.
 Jamie - the postman in Steven Universe.
 Mary Minor 'Harry' Harristeen - postmistress of Crozet in a series of mystery novels by Rita Mae Brown
 Mr. Wilson -  retired mail carrier from the American comic strip Dennis the Menace
 Norris Cole - postmaster at The Kabin newsagents and post office, Coronation Street
 Parcel Mistress - also known as PM from Homestuck
 Pat Clifton - Postman Pat (postman)
 Pete - the mail carrier in Animal Crossing.
 Rita Sullivan - postmistress at  the Kabin newsagents and post office, Coronation Street
 Sam Porter Bridges - the player-character in Death Stranding, portrayed by Norman Reedus.
 Snail - A Year with Frog and Toad
 Special Delivery Kluger -  Santa Claus is Comin' to Town (1970)
 Stan - the postman in Wizadora
 Stanley Stupid - The Stupids (film)
 The Courier - the player-character in Fallout: New Vegas.
 Vince Parker -  a postman played by Peter Brookes and featured in the television soap opera Crossroads
 Viv Hope - postmistress at the village post office in Emmerdale
 Clive James - writer and broadcaster; had a walk-on part in Neighbours as Ramsay Street’s postman
 Jamie Hope - Emmerdale
 Herman Post -  Jon Arbuckle's mailman whom Garfield constantly torments in the Garfield comic strip
 Masood Ahmed - EastEnders
 Mr. Zip -  a cartoon character used by the United States Postal Service
 Shabnam Masood - EastEnders
 Zainab Masood - EastEnders
Evil Mailman - Olive, the Other Reindeer
Fumika - postmistress from the light novel and anime Shigofumi: Letters from the Departed
George the tortoise -  Playhouse Disney's The Koala Brothers
Lag Seeing -  delivery boy from the manga and anime Tegami Bachi
Manic Mailman -  cartoon mailman on Itchy & Scratchy, Bart Simpson's favorite show on The Simpsons
Miss Maccalariat - Going Postal
Mr. Beasley - Blondie
Myron Larabee - Jingle All the Way
Pechkin - Three from Prostokvashino
Reba - the mail woman in Pee-wee's Playhouse
Sam Drucker -  Petticoat Junction and  Green Acres; runs a post office in his general store
Agent K - played by Tommy Lee Jones  in Men in Black II; within the MiB universe, most postal workers are aliens
Stanley Howler - Going Postal
Cliff Clavin - Cheers
Denise Fox - EastEnders
Anghammarad - Going Postal
Tolliver Groat - Going Postal
Henry Chinaski - Charles Bukowski's alter ego in the book Post Office
Moist von Lipwig - Going Postal (postmaster)
Mr. McFeely - Mister Rogers' Neighborhood
Mrs. Goggins - Postman Pat (postmistress)
Newman - Seinfeld
Willie Lumpkin -   mailman of the Fantastic Four in Marvel Comics
Postman - The Evillious Chronicles

Postal employees